Macrorchis is a genus of flies belonging to the family Muscidae.

The species of this genus are found in Europe and Northern America.

Species:
 Macrorchis alone (Walker, 1849) 
 Macrorchis ausoba (Walker, 1849)

References

Muscidae
Brachycera genera
Taxa named by Camillo Rondani